Arvid Söderblom (born August 19, 1999) is a Swedish professional ice hockey goaltender currently playing for the Rockford IceHogs in the American Hockey League (AHL) as a prospect to the Chicago Blackhawks of the National Hockey League (NHL). Arvid's younger brother Elmer is a forward who currently plays for the Detroit Red Wings.

On May 13, 2021, Söderblom agreed to terms with the Chicago Blackhawks of the National Hockey League on a two-year contract. He made his NHL debut on January 1, 2022.

Playing career 
On May 13, 2021, Söderblom as an undrafted free agent, agreed to terms with the Chicago Blackhawks of the National Hockey League on a two-year contract.

On January 1, 2022, Söderblom made his NHL debut in a game against the Nashville Predators. He allowed 3 goals on 18 shots, resulting in him being pulled and taking the loss in a 6–1 game. On January 2, 2022, Söderblom made his home debut in a game against the Calgary Flames; He allowed 4 goals on 41 shots in a 5–1 loss.

Career statistics

Regular season and playoffs

International

References

External links
 

1999 births
Living people
Chicago Blackhawks players
Frölunda HC players
Rockford IceHogs (AHL) players
Skellefteå AIK players
Ice hockey people from Gothenburg
Swedish ice hockey goaltenders
Tingsryds AIF players
Undrafted National Hockey League players